Prince Gorm of Denmark (b. Jægersborghus, 24 February 1919 – Copenhagen, 26 December 1991) was the first son of Prince Harald of Denmark and his wife, Princess Helena of Schleswig-Holstein-Sonderburg-Glücksburg.

He was an officer of the Royal Danish Navy.

He was a nephew of Christian X of Denmark, and as a result of the Danish Act of Succession of 1953, which restricts the throne to direct descendants of Christian X, he lost his place in the line of succession.

He died unmarried and without children.

Bibliography
 

1919 births
1991 deaths
House of Glücksburg (Denmark)
Danish princes
Recipients of the Cross of Honour of the Order of the Dannebrog
Burials at Roskilde Cathedral